Dirty Mind is the third studio album by American singer-songwriter, and multi-instrumentalist Prince. It was released on October 8, 1980, by Warner Bros. Records and produced entirely by Prince at his home studio in Minneapolis, Minnesota earlier that year from May to June. Dirty Mind has been considered by critics to be his most creative and boldest album, setting the standard for his artistic direction in the following years.

A fusion of post-disco, new wave, funk and dance, Dirty Mind has more punk sounds than Prince's previous albums. Prince’s high and feminine vocals, along with his androgynous image during the album's era, has been commended. Controversially, the album's theme is fueled by explicit topics including oral sex, threesome, incest and ejaculation, which has been credited for opening the doors for sexually explicit albums in the coming years.

The first single of Dirty Mind, "Uptown" reached number five on both the Billboard Hot Soul Singles and the Billboard National Disco Action Top 30 charts. Though the album only reached number 45 on the Billboard 200, it earned widespread acclaim from music critics and crossover success. Due to its fusion of genres, critics have hailed it for setting the sound for urban black music of the early 1980s. The album has been ranked by several publications as one of the greatest albums of all time.

Background 
During the spring of 1980, Prince and his backing band members Dez Dickerson, André Cymone, drummer Bobby Z, and keyboardists Doctor Fink and Gayle Chapman spent nine weeks on the road opening for Rick James, a rival of Prince. James accused Prince of "copping my licks" throughout the tour.

Following the end of James' tour, Prince returned to Minnesota, rented a house in Wayzata where he set up a 16-track studio that Warner Bros. paid for. Although there were problems with the amount of space, Prince told Rolling Stone, "Nobody knew what was going on, and I became totally engulfed in it...It really felt like me for once."

In the past Prince mostly recorded alone but the backing band members contributed to Dirty Mind. A keyboard line that Doctor Fink jammed out during a rehearsal provided the basis for "Dirty Mind"; Doctor Fink cut the track.

Composition
Dirty Mind was mainly recorded in Prince's home studio throughout 1980, and several of the songs were cut in one night, giving them a sparse, demo-like quality. The title track was released as a single and described as "robotic funk" by AllMusic's Stephen Thomas Erlewine, while "When You Were Mine", notably covered by Cyndi Lauper on her album She's So Unusual, is "pure new wave pop". "Do It All Night" and "Head", a sexually explicit song about a chance meeting with a bride-to-be and seducing her with oral sex, contain "sultry funk"; "Gotta Broken Heart Again", the only ballad on the record, features "soulful crooning"; and the rock-influenced "Sister" describes incest between the song's protagonist and his older sibling ("Incest is everything it's said to be"). "Uptown" and "Partyup" are "relentless dance jams", according to Erlewine; the former became a top-five hit on the Billboard Dance and R&B charts in late 1980, and the latter was performed on Saturday Night Live on February 21, 1981.

Release 
Dirty Mind peaked at number 45 on the Billboard 200 and number 7 on the Billboard Top Black Albums chart. On June 6, 1984, the album was certified Gold by the Recording Industry Association of America (RIAA).  Following the death of Prince in 2016, the album re-entered the Billboard 200 and also entered the album charts in France, Switzerland and the UK for the first time.

Singles 
The first single, "Uptown" reached No. 101 on the Billboard Bubbling Under Hot 100 Singles but peaked within the top five of the R&B Singles chart and the Dance chart. The title track was released as the second single and was modestly successful on the R&B chart. The songs "Uptown", "Dirty Mind", and "Head" were released together, reaching the dance chart's top five. "Head" was featured in the movie Waiting to Exhale.

Critical reception and legacy

Dirty Mind was met with critical acclaim. In a rave review published by Rolling Stone in February 1981, Ken Tucker wrote that the album makes an unexpected progression from the "doe-eyed" romanticism of Prince's first two records to a "liberating lewdness" which "jolts with the unsettling tension that arises from rubbing complex erotic wordplay against clean, simple melodies", all along an "ELECTRIC surface". Specifically of Prince's performance as a vocalist, Tucker remarked on how he casually delivers lyrics with a "graceful quaver" and "exhilarating breathlessness", drawing from both "the sweet romanticism of Smokey Robinson" and "the powerful vulgate poetry of Richard Pryor". The resulting music, he said, is "cool", "dealing with hot emotions", and, "at its best ... positively filthy". Writing that same month in The Village Voice, Robert Christgau found the music's "metallic textures and simple drum patterns" comparable to both Funkadelic and the Rolling Stones, while acknowledging Prince as being in the generally shy-mannered "love-man" tradition because of his falsetto singing, but ultimately distinct in his "aggressively, audaciously erotic" character: "I'm talking about your basic fuckbook fantasies—the kid sleeps with his sister and digs it, sleeps with his girlfriend's boyfriend and doesn't, and stops a wedding by gamahuching the bride on her way to church. I mean, Mick Jagger can just fold up his penis and go home."

Retrospective appraisals have also been positive. Stephen Thomas Erlewine from AllMusic describes the album as a "stunning, audacious amalgam of funk, new wave, R&B, and pop, fueled by grinningly salacious sex and the desire to shock" and that it "set the style for much of the urban soul and funk of the early '80s". According to Michaelangelo Matos in The New Rolling Stone Album Guide (2004), "Dirty Mind remains one of the most radical 180-degree turns in pop history." Robert Hilburn of the Los Angeles Times describes the music as a "confident and highly danceable blend of post-disco funk and tasty, hard-line rock", Prince's songwriting contains prominently sexual lyrics. while Keith Harris of Blender credits it for setting "confessions of a sex junkie" to the sounds of "new-wave funk".

Due to Dirty Mind's fusion of genres, critics have hailed it for setting the sound for urban black music of the early 1980s. Prince’s high and feminine vocals, along with his androgynous image during the Dirty Mind era, has been recognized for bringing attention to gaydar. The album's theme of explicit topics including oral sex, threesome and ejaculation has been credited for opening the doors for sexually explicit albums in the coming years. In Christgau's opinion, Prince's impact as a "commercially viable" yet "visionary" artist with the album was comparable to John Lennon, Bob Dylan, and Jimi Hendrix.

Dirty Mind has ranked highly and frequently on professional lists of the greatest albums. Pitchfork placed the album at number 87 on a list of the 100 best albums from the 1980s, while Slant Magazine ranked it 53rd on a similar list. In 2013, NME ranked it number 393 in its list of The 500 Greatest Albums of All Time. Rolling Stone has ranked it number 326 among the magazine's 500 greatest albums of all time (published in 2020) and 18th among albums from the 1980s. Based on such rankings, the aggregate website Acclaimed Music lists Dirty Mind as the 419th most acclaimed album in history, as well as the 55th from the 1980s and sixth among albums released in 1980.

Track listing

Personnel

 Prince – lead vocals, backing vocals, all instrumentation except where noted below:
 Lisa Coleman – backing vocals on "Head"
 Doctor Fink – synthesizer on "Dirty Mind" and "Head"
Technical
 Mic Guzauski – remixer
 Bob Mockler – remixer
 Ron Garrett – assistant
 Bernie Grundman – mastering (A&M Records)
 Allen Beaulieu – photography

Charts

Weekly charts

Year-end charts

Singles
 "Uptown" (US) (#101 US, #5 US R&B, #5 US Dance)
 "Dirty Mind" (US) (#65 US R&B)
 "Do It All Night" (UK)

Certifications

References
Footnotes

Citations

Bibliography

External links
 

1980 albums
Prince (musician) albums
Albums produced by Prince (musician)
Warner Records albums
Albums recorded in a home studio